The 254th Combat Communications Group (254 CCG) is a non-flying unit of the Texas Air National Guard located at Hensley Field, Dallas, Texas.  If activated to federal service, the wing is gained by Air Combat Command.

Mission

Federal Mission
The 254th Combat Communications Group provides a full spectrum of communications capabilities to include planning, engineering, command level coordination, and a wide array of tactical communications solutions to the combatant command or joint task force. The 254th also provides functional advocacy and leadership to eight aligned units spanning seven states. Upon mobilization, Air Force Space Command will assume operational command of the 254 CCG and direct deployment of the Group.

State Mission
The 254th Combat Communications Group's state mission is to provide ready forces to the state of Texas during local or statewide emergencies to protect life and property, and to preserve peace, order, and public safety. The 254 CCG also provides the Adjutant General with voice and data capabilities in austere environments.

History
The 254th Combat Communications Group was originally organized as a Group Headquarters in June 1971 under the name 254th Mobile Communications Group. The unit was co-located with the 221st Mobile Communications Squadron and consisted of assigned units in Texas, Arkansas, Louisiana, and Mississippi.

The unit was later re-designated the 254th Combat Information Systems Group in July 1985. A year later in October 1986 it was re-designated the 254th Combat Communications Group.  The Group has deployed its personnel and equipment to all corners of the United States and around the world.  It has provided direct support to federal operations by deploying personnel to Iraq, Afghanistan, and Kuwait.  The 254th has also supported recovery operations for Hurricane Katrina, Hurricane Rita, Hurricane Ike, and Hurricane Gustav, among others.  The Group was instrumental in supporting Space Shuttle launches in conjunction with Operation Noble Eagle and moving the 624th Operations Center from Barksdale Air Force Base to Joint Base San Antonio.  More recently, the group and its aligned squadrons supported United States Air Forces in Europe in multiple exercises as part of the European Reassurance Initiative.

Assignments

Major Command/Gaining Command
Air National Guard/Air Combat Command (2018 – present)
Air National Guard/Air Force Space Command (2008 – 2018)
Air National Guard/Air Combat Command (1992 – 2008)
Air National Guard/Tactical Air Command (1971 – 1992)

Previous designations
 254th Combat Communications Group (Oct 1986 – present)
 254th Combat Information Systems Group (Jul 1985 – Oct 1986)
 254th Mobile Communications Group (Jun 1971 – Jul 1985)

Squadrons assigned
 147th Combat Communications Squadron – San Diego, California
 221st Combat Communications Squadron – Dallas, Texas
 236th Combat Communications Squadron – Hammond, Louisiana
 239th Combat Communications Squadron – St. Louis, Missouri
 242d Combat Communications Squadron – Spokane, Washington
 264th Combat Communications Squadron – Peoria, Illinois
 291st Combat Communications Squadron – Hilo, Hawaii
 292d Combat Communications Squadron – Kahului, Hawaii
 272d Engineering Installation Squadron – LaPorte, Texas

Squadrons previously assigned
 205th Engineering Installation Squadron – Oklahoma City, Oklahoma
 214th Engineering Installation Squadron New Orleans, Louisiana
 219th Engineering Installation Squadron – Tulsa, Oklahoma
 223rd Combat Communications Squadron – Hot Springs, Arkansas
 232d Combat Communications Squadron – Montgomery, Alabama
 248th Air Traffic Control Squadron – Meridian, Mississippi
 259th Air Traffic Control Squadron – Alexandria, Louisiana
 285th Combat Communications Squadron – Saint Croix, U.S. Virgin Islands
 293rd Combat Communications Squadron – Hickam AFB, Hawaii

Bases stationed
Hensley Field, Texas (2010–present)
Garland, Texas (1952–2010)

Commander
 Col Christopher P. Wimberly

Decorations
Meritorious Unit Award 
2021

Air Force Outstanding Unit Award five oak leaf clusters 
2021
2016
2014
2008
2006
1978

References

External links
Texas Air National Guard: 254th Combat Communications Group

Combat Communications 0254
Combat Communications 0254
Military units and formations in Texas